Anderbergia is a genus of flowering plants in the family Asteraceae described as a genus in 1996.

 Species
All the species are native to the Cape Provinces region of South Africa.
 Anderbergia elsiae B.Nord.
 Anderbergia epaleata (Hilliard & B.L.Burtt) B.Nord.
 Anderbergia fallax B.Nord.
 Anderbergia rooibergensis B.Nord.
 Anderbergia ustulata B.Nord.
 Anderbergia vlokii (Hilliard) B.Nord.

References

Gnaphalieae
Asteraceae genera
Flora of the Cape Provinces
Endemic flora of South Africa